Igor Viktorovich Zenkovich (born 17 September 1987) is a Belarusian professional football player.

Career

Club
Zenkovich moved to Aktobe for the 2014 season, signing a one-year contract, with his contract not being renewed in December of the same year.
In June 2015, Zenkovich returned to Kazakhstan, signing for FC Tobol, moving to FC Taraz in January 2016.

In January 2017, Zenkovich signed for FC Aktobe.

On 11 January 2018, FC Atyrau announced the signing of Zenkovich.

International
In May 2018, Zenkovich was called up to the Kazakhstan national team for the first time.

Honours
Shakhter Karagandy
Kazakhstan Cup winner: 2013

Kaisar
Kazakhstan Cup winner: 2019

References

External links
 
 
 Profile at Dinamo Minsk website

1987 births
Living people
Belarusian footballers
Association football forwards
Belarusian expatriate footballers
Expatriate footballers in Kazakhstan
Expatriate footballers in Turkey
Kazakhstan Premier League players
TFF First League players
FC BATE Borisov players
FC Neman Grodno players
FC Khimik Svetlogorsk players
FC Darida Minsk Raion players
FC Dinamo Minsk players
FC Dnepr Mogilev players
FC Akzhayik players
FC Shakhter Karagandy players
FC Aktobe players
Elazığspor footballers
FC Tobol players
FC Taraz players
FC Kaisar players
FC Kyzylzhar players
FC Minsk players
Footballers from Minsk